Dustin Aaron Moseley (born December 26, 1981) is an American former professional baseball pitcher. He played in Major League Baseball (MLB) for the Los Angeles Angels of Anaheim, New York Yankees and San Diego Padres.

Career
Moseley was selected by the Cincinnati Reds in the first round (34th overall) of the 2000 Major League Baseball draft. Prior to the  season, he was ranked by Baseball America as the fourth best prospect in the Reds' organization. Moseley was traded to the Angels' organization for pitcher Ramón Ortiz in 2004.

Los Angeles Angels of Anaheim
Moseley won his first game as the starting pitcher for the Angels in his Major League Baseball debut on July 17, 2006. With injuries to key starters Bartolo Colón and Jered Weaver, Moseley began the 2007 season in the Angels starting rotation. After the return of Jered Weaver, he was moved to the bullpen in middle relief.

Moseley had surgery to repair an ulnar nerve following the 2007 season.  He had hip surgery during 2009 season.

Moseley became a free agent after the 2009 season.

New York Yankees

In 2010, Moseley was a non-roster invitee to spring training with the New York Yankees.  He began the season with the Triple-A Scranton/Wilkes-Barre Yankees. On July 2, 2010, he was called up to the Yankees. He was inserted in the Yankees' starting rotation, while Andy Pettitte was on the disabled list. He was non-tendered after the season.

San Diego Padres
After the 2010 season, Moseley signed a one-year contract with the San Diego Padres.  He struggled during the season partly due to a lack of run support. On July 26, he disclocated his left shoulder after getting a base hit, which ended his season with a 3-10 record and 3.30 ERA (a career best) in 120 innings. On May 7, 2012, Moseley was again placed on the disabled list due to labrum damage in his right shoulder.

After making only 1 start in 2012, Moseley elected free agency after clearing outright waivers. Moseley was a non-tender candidate by the Padres.

Miami Marlins
After sitting out the 2013 season, Moseley agreed to a minor league deal with the Miami Marlins in early August. Moseley made just 6 starts between A ball and Double-A before going on the 7-Day DL. He became a free agent after the 2014 season.

Pitching repertoire
Moseley relied primarily on an 89-90 mile per hour four-seam fastball, and also threw a curveball and a changeup.

References

External links

1981 births
Living people
People from Texarkana, Arkansas
Baseball players from Arkansas
Los Angeles Angels players
New York Yankees players
San Diego Padres players
Major League Baseball pitchers
Dayton Dragons players
Stockton Ports players
Chattanooga Lookouts players
Louisville Bats players
Salt Lake Stingers players
Salt Lake Bees players
Rancho Cucamonga Quakes players
Scranton/Wilkes-Barre Yankees players
Greensboro Grasshoppers players
Jacksonville Suns players